Gotebo   is a town in Kiowa County, Oklahoma, United States. The population was 226 at the 2010 census, a decline of 16.9 percent from 272 in 2000.

The town is named after the notable Kiowa Indian named Gotebo (1847 - 1927) (in Kiowa).

History
The town now known as Gotebo was originally named Harrison (honoring President Benjamin Harrison) when it was founded in August 1901, during the opening of the Kiowa, Comanche, and Apache Reservation. A railroad station had been built nearby a few months before, which officials of the Chicago, Rock Island and Pacific Railway had named Gotebo, in honor of a well-respected Kiowa chief. He was one of the first Kiowa baptized at the Rainy Mountain Church, and was buried at the Rainy Mountain Indian Cemetery, between Gotebo and Mountain View. The name of the post office was soon changed from Harrison to Gotebo, and the town incorporated under the latter name.

Geography
Gotebo is located at  (35.070094, -98.874163).

Demographics

As of the census of 2000, there were 272 people, 120 households, and 80 families residing in the town. There were 157 housing units at an average density of 203.9 per square mile (78.7/km2). The racial makeup of the town was 90.44% White, 7.35% Native American, 1.47% from other races, and 0.74% from two or more races. Hispanic or Latino of any race were 6.62% of the population.

There were 120 households, out of which 25.0% had children under the age of 18 living with them, 55.0% were married couples living together, 9.2% had a female householder with no husband present, and 33.3% were non-families. 31.7% of all households were made up of individuals, and 16.7% had someone living alone who was 65 years of age or older. The average household size was 2.27 and the average family size was 2.84.

In the town, the population was spread out, with 20.2% under the age of 18, 7.7% from 18 to 24, 22.1% from 25 to 44, 28.7% from 45 to 64, and 21.3% who were 65 years of age or older. The median age was 45 years. For every 100 females, there were 94.3 males. For every 100 females age 18 and over, there were 95.5 males.

The median income for a household in the town was $26,500, and the median income for a family was $35,156. Males had a median income of $25,694 versus $22,500 for females. The per capita income for the town was $14,783. About 8.2% of families and 14.3% of the population were below the poverty line, including 7.4% of those under the age of eighteen and 21.1% of those 65 or over.

Economy
Agriculture (mainly cotton and wheat farming and cattle ranching) support the local economy. Many town residents are retired, while those who are employed generally commute to jobs in Hobart or Mountain View.

References

External links
 Encyclopedia of Oklahoma History and Culture - Gotebo
 Oklahoma Digital Maps: Digital Collections of Oklahoma and Indian Territory

Towns in Kiowa County, Oklahoma
Towns in Oklahoma
Populated places established in 1901
1901 establishments in Oklahoma Territory